Myresjö/Vetlanda FK is a Swedish football club located in Myresjö in Vetlanda Municipality, Jönköping County.

Background

Myresjö Idrottsförening were founded in 1943 with the founding members seeking club participation in the sports of orienteering, running, skiing, athletics, football and bandy. However, only football and skiing have had a longer life.  Ice hockey and table tennis were introduced in the 1950s but both ended in the late 60s.

Over the last 50 years Myresjö IF has participated mainly in the upper and middle divisions of the Swedish football league system.  In their early days Myresjö IF's football team resided in the lower divisions. In 1959 the team were in Division 7 and began to progress up the league. In 1968 they won Division 4 and took the step up to Division 3. 1977 the team won its Division 3 section in superior style, but missed out on promotion by losing in the Division 2 qualification playoffs. However, in 1981 they were successful in progressing to Division 2 Södra, which was at that time the second tier of the Swedish football. The club played at this level for 12 of the next 16 seasons, their best season being in 1987 when they finished 4th in Division 1 Södra.

Since their foundation Myresjö IF has participated mainly in the upper and middle divisions of the Swedish football league system.  The club currently plays in Division 3 Nordöstra Götaland which is the fifth tier of Swedish football. They play their home matches at the Myrvalla in Myresjö.

Their home ground was inaugurated in 1962 with a gravel training pitch added in 1967 and a grass training pitch in 1977. In 1978 the name Myrvalla was adopted. The clubhouse was completed in Spring 1982 in time for the club's premiere in Division 2 Södra. The main stand was opened on 28 July 1987 in a match against a match against Örgryte IS.

Many leading Swedish clubs played at Myrvalla over the years in league or cup matches. These include Halmstad BK, Malmö FF, Helsingborgs IF, IF Elfsborg and Kalmar FF to name a few. In the 1980s British teams – Queens Park Rangers F.C., Rangers and Nottingham Forest – played friendlies at Myrvalla.

In early 2013, Myresjö IF merged with Vetlanda FF and Bäckseda IF to create the club Myresjö/Vetlanda FK. Myresjö/Vetlanda FK are affiliated to Smålands Fotbollförbund.  The club's best season in the Svenska Cupen was in 1991 when they reached the semi-final.

Season to season

Attendances

In recent seasons Myresjö IF have had the following average attendances:

The attendance record for Myresjö IF was set in 1988 when 3,099 spectators attended the match against Halmstad BK.

Footnotes

External links
 Myresjö/Vetlanda FK – Official website
 Myresjö IF on Facebook

Football clubs in Jönköping County
1943 establishments in Sweden
Association football clubs established in 1943
Bandy clubs established in 1943
Defunct bandy clubs in Sweden